Loughbrickland Crannóg is a Bronze Age man-made island known as a crannóg, four miles (6.5 km) south west of Banbridge, County Down, Northern Ireland. It is situated in the middle of the lough, 1 mile from the village of Loughbrickland. The crannóg in Loughbrickland is a Scheduled Historic Monument in the townland of Drumnahare, in Banbridge District, at grid reference J1113 4118. It is easily visible from the south-bound carriageway of the trunk A1 Belfast-Dublin route, just past the B3 Rathfriland exit.

References

Archaeological sites in County Down
Scheduled monuments in Northern Ireland
Islands of County Down
Uninhabited islands of Northern Ireland
Former populated places in Northern Ireland
Bronze Age sites in Europe
Lake islands of Northern Ireland
Crannogs in Ireland